James Stillman Rockefeller (June 8, 1902 – August 10, 2004) was a member of the prominent U.S. Rockefeller family. He won an Olympic rowing title for the United States, then became president of what eventually became Citigroup. He was a trustee of the American Museum of Natural History and a member of the board of overseers of Memorial Sloan Kettering Cancer Center.

Early life and rowing
He was born on June 8, 1902, to William Goodsell Rockefeller (1870–1922) and Elsie Stillman, daughter of James Stillman, in the Manhattan borough of New York City.  He graduated from The Taft School, Watertown, Connecticut, in 1920, and graduated from Yale University in 1924, where he was elected to Scroll and Key and Phi Beta Kappa.  He was also a member of Delta Kappa Epsilon.  That same year Rockefeller captained a crew of Yale teammates that included Benjamin Spock. They won a gold medal in rowing at the 1924 Summer Olympics in Paris, France.  Rockefeller appeared on the cover of Time magazine on July 7, 1924.

Career
Rockefeller returned from the Olympics and spent the next six years with the Wall Street banking firm of Brown Bros. & Co. He joined the National City Bank in New York in 1930 and was president from 1952 to 1959 and chairman from 1959 to 1967. He retired as chairman in 1967.  During his tenure, the bank merged with the smaller First National Bank and took the name The First National City Bank of New York.

Under each of his successors, the bank's name has changed: George S. Moore shortened it to "First National City Bank" and formed a holding company, First National City Corp.  Under Walter B. Wriston these became "Citibank" and "Citicorp" respectively.  Under John Reed the firm merged with Travelers Group to become Citigroup. During World War II, Rockefeller served in the Airborne Command.

Personal life
On April 15, 1925, he married Nancy Carnegie, who died in 1994. She was a granddaughter of Thomas M. Carnegie and grandniece of Andrew Carnegie. Nancy helped establish the Greenwich Maternal Health Center in 1935.  Together, they had four children:

 James Stillman Rockefeller Jr., who was married to Liv Coucheron Torp (d. 1969), who had previously been married to Thor Heyerdahl. He had previously been engaged to Margaret Wise Brown before her death.
 Nancy Sherlock Rockefeller, who married Barclay McFadden, Jr. (d. 1973), After his death, she married Daniel Noyes Copp (d. 2015)
 Andrew Carnegie Rockefeller, who married Jean Victoria Mackay
 Georgia Stillman Rockefeller, who married James Harden Rose

Rockefeller died on August 10, 2004, at the age of 102 in Greenwich, Connecticut, following a stroke.

Residences
Rockefeller lived in Greenwich, Connecticut, in a  brick Georgian mansion, built in 1929, with 11 bedrooms and 16 marble bathrooms on four levels. There are 12 fireplaces, an elevator, an outdoor pool and English gardens. His house was sold in 2004 for $13.4 million and resold in 2009 for $23.9 million.

In January 1937, he became the full owner of Long Valley Farm near Spring Lake in Cumberland County and Harnett County, North Carolina.

Legacy
At the time of his death, Rockefeller had four children, fourteen grandchildren, thirty-seven great-grandchildren, and one great-great granddaughter.  Rockefeller was America's oldest living Olympic champion, and the earliest living cover subject of Time magazine.

References

External links
Time Magazine Cover July 7, 1924
Yale Olympic Rower Passes Away at 102

 

 
 
 

1902 births
2004 deaths
Sportspeople from New York City
Philanthropists from New York (state)
American male rowers
Olympic gold medalists for the United States in rowing
Rowers at the 1924 Summer Olympics
Rockefeller family
Taft School alumni
Yale University alumni
American centenarians
Medalists at the 1924 Summer Olympics
Men centenarians
Carnegie family